Bench-Stone is a public art work by modernist Japanese artist Masayuki Nagare located at the Lynden Sculpture Garden near Milwaukee, Wisconsin. The sculpture is an abstract, rectangular form lying horizontally with a shallow concave spherical depression on the top and installed on the lawn.

References

Outdoor sculptures in Milwaukee
1965 sculptures
Granite sculptures in Wisconsin
1965 establishments in Wisconsin